Thomas Norris or Tom Norris may refer to:

United Kingdom 
Thomas Norris (fl. 1363–1391), MP for Lewes
Thomas Norris (died 1425) (died 1424/25), MP for Barnstaple, Totnes and Plympton Erle
Thomas Norris (died 1599) (1556–1599), English soldier and politician in Ireland
Thomas Norris (died 1607), MP for Castle Rising
Thomas Norris (died 1700), MP for Liverpool
Thomas Norris (1765–1852), English businessman, art collector, naturalist and astronomer
Thomas Norris (composer) (1741–1790), English musician, singer and composer
Tom Norris (boxer) (fl. 1925), Welsh boxer
Tom Norris (musician) (born 1971), English songwriter and musician

United States 

 Thomas R. Norris (born 1944), retired United States Navy SEAL
 Tom Norris (record producer) (born 1991), American mixing engineer and record producer

See also

Norris Thomas (born 1954), American football player